Vekre, also known as Henning, is a village in the municipality of Steinkjer in Trøndelag county, Norway. The main church for this area is Henning Church, located on the south side of the village. The parish is called Henning.

References

Villages in Trøndelag
Steinkjer